Tigersushi Records is an independent record label based in Paris, France.  They have released music by MU, Ivan Smagghe, Poni Hoax, Pierre Bastien, DyE, The Faulty Shotgun, John Tejada, among others.

See also
 List of record labels

External links
 Official site
 XLR8R feature on Tigersushi

French independent record labels
Electronic music record labels